The Atlas Science Center, formerly Paper Discovery Center, is a museum and workshop center focused on papermaking in Appleton, Wisconsin, United States, where paper is an important local industry.

Programs in the past have included hands-on work experience, tours, and general information on papermaking. There is a Science Summer Series for children at the center.

The Paper Discovery Center opened in February 2005. It was first conceived in 1999 as part of the Paper Industry International Hall of Fame, Inc. The Kimberly-Clark Corporation donated its former Atlas Mill on the Fox River in Appleton to house the center.

References

External links 
 Atlas Science Center website
 Paper Industry International Hall of Fame

Museums established in 2005
Industry museums in Wisconsin
Buildings and structures in Appleton, Wisconsin
Papermaking in the United States
Museums in Outagamie County, Wisconsin
Papermaking museums